Old Mittagong Post Office is a heritage-listed former post office at 5 Station Street, Mittagong, Wingecarribee Shire, New South Wales, Australia. It was added to the New South Wales State Heritage Register on 2 April 1999.

History 

The old Mittagong Post Office was built in 1890-91. The land was purchased from the Commercial Banking Company of Sydney in 1887, and it was built by Gatty and Flook, who tendered £1393 for construction. The verandah was removed  1948, and the balcony was infilled with windows featuring glass louvres some time after 1949. Low cast iron lace work balustrade was also removed. The building was originally all facebrick, which has been painted and paint removed over time. In 1917 a photo shows the eastern wall painted but the front unpainted.

In 1962, planning commenced to replace the old post office with a new building on Hume Highway, for which tenders closed about July 1963. The new post office opened on 4 August 1964, after which the Station Street office closed.

In October 2015, the Wingecarribee council approved a renovation proposal which would turn the most of the ground floor into a cafe and the remainder, along with the first floor into accommodation and office space. Two detached two-storey additions on the site were approved at the same time. The ground floor was vacant in February 2018.

Heritage listing 
Old Mittagong Post Office was listed on the New South Wales State Heritage Register on 2 April 1999.

See also 

 List of post office buildings in New South Wales

References

Attribution

External links

New South Wales State Heritage Register
Mittagong, New South Wales
Mittagong
Articles incorporating text from the New South Wales State Heritage Register